Zangi Choqa (also Romanized as Zangī Choqā) is a village in Dorudfaraman Rural District, in the Central District of Kermanshah County, Kermanshah Province, Iran. At the 2006 census, its population was 243, in 48 families.

References 

Populated places in Kermanshah County